Eugenia ngadimaniana is a species of plant in the family Myrtaceae. It is found in Malaysia and Singapore. It is threatened by habitat loss.

References

ngadimaniana
Vulnerable plants
Taxonomy articles created by Polbot